Theodore Quentin 'Ike' Sellers (17 July 1905 – 12 October 1997) was an Australian rules footballer who played with Melbourne in the Victorian Football League (VFL).

Football

Carlton (VFL)
Sellers was from Tasmania, and was given a clearance to Carlton on 2 May 1930: but only ever played for their reserves.

Hawthorn (VFL)
He subsequently transferred to Hawthorn but again could not manage a senior game.

Coburg (VFA)
He was cleared from Hawthorn to Coburg in the VFA on 10 June 1931.

Melbourne (VFL)
Sellers eventually made his league debut for Melbourne in 1932, but only played two senior games before breaking a bone in his leg.

Notes

References
 Holmesby, Russell & Main, Jim (2009), The Encyclopedia of AFL Footballers: every AFL/VFL player since 1897 (8th ed.), Seaford, Victoria: BAS Publishing. 
 T. Sellers in Hobart, The North-Eastern Advertiser, (Friday, 3 June 1927), p.2.

External links 

 
Ike Sellers's playing statistics from The VFA Project
 Ike Sellers, at Demonwiki.

1905 births
Australian rules footballers from Tasmania
Cananore Football Club players
Melbourne Football Club players
Coburg Football Club players
1997 deaths